Manja Smits (born 27 May 1985 in De Bilt) is a Dutch politician. She was an MP for the Socialist Party (Socialistische Partij) from 22 April 2008 until 15 April 2014, specializing in matters of primary and secondary education. From May 2013 onward, she was replaced by Eric Smaling. Since 2007 she has also been an SP's party executive.

Smits stayed for a half a year in Bolivia, where she worked in an orphanage. Afterwards she studied history at the University of Groningen. During her study she presided both the Groningen section of SP's youth organization ROOD and thereafter the SP Groningen section.

References 
  Parlement.com biography

External links 

  House of Representatives biography

1985 births
Living people
Members of the House of Representatives (Netherlands)
People from De Bilt
Politicians from Groningen (city)
Socialist Party (Netherlands) politicians
University of Groningen alumni
21st-century Dutch politicians
21st-century Dutch women politicians